Johnson-Wolfe Farm, more commonly known as the Comus Inn, is a historic set of four buildings located at Comus, Montgomery County, Maryland. The complex includes a ca. 1862 vernacular dwelling known as the Comus Inn, smokehouse, and barn, and a ca. 1936 poultry house.

It was listed on the National Register of Historic Places in 2003.

References

External links
, including photo in 2002, at Maryland Historical Trust website

Houses in Montgomery County, Maryland
Houses on the National Register of Historic Places in Maryland
National Register of Historic Places in Montgomery County, Maryland